The 1868 United States presidential election in Nebraska took place on November 3, 1868, as part of the 1868 United States presidential election. State voters chose three representatives, or electors, to the Electoral College, who voted for president and vice president.

Nebraska participated in its first ever presidential election, having become the 37th state on March 1, 1867. The state was won by Ulysses S. Grant, formerly the 6th Commanding General of the United States Army (R-Illinois), running with Speaker of the House Schuyler Colfax, with 63.91% of the popular vote, against the 18th governor of New York, Horatio Seymour (D–New York), running with former Senator Francis Preston Blair, Jr., with 36.09% of the vote.

Results

See also
 United States presidential elections in Nebraska

References

Nebraska
1868
1868 Nebraska elections